St Peter's Church is a Church of England church in Marchington, Staffordshire. It is the only church in the parish of St. Peter Marchington.

History
The church was built in 1742 and was designed by Mark Parsons. A war memorial was added after the First World War.

Today
St Peter's Church lies in the Deanery of Uttoxeter and the archdeaconry of Stoke-on-Trent. The Church is part of the Uttoxeter Area of parishes along with Bramshall, Checkley, Gratwich, Kingstone, Leigh, Marchington Woodlands, Stramshall, The Heath and Uttoxeter.

See also
Grade II* listed buildings in East Staffordshire
Listed buildings in Marchington

References

External links
 Uttoxeter area of Parishes
 Official website

Borough of East Staffordshire
Church of England church buildings in Staffordshire
Church of England church buildings in the Borough of East Staffordshire
Peter